Bengal Warriors (BEN) is a Kabaddi team based in Kolkata, West Bengal that plays in the Pro Kabaddi League. In 2019, they won the trophy for the first time by defeating Dabang Delhi. The team is currently led by Maninder Singh and coached by Kasinatha Baskaran. The team play their home matches at the Netaji Indoor Stadium.

Franchise history
Pro Kabaddi League (PKL) is a professional kabaddi league in India, based on the format of the Indian Premier League tournament. The first edition of the tournament was played in 2014 with eight franchises representing various cities in India. Bengal Warriors is a Kolkata based franchise owned by Future Group, promoted by Kishore Biyani. The team had poor campaign in the first two seasons. The team's performance, however improved from the third season as they qualified for the playoffs in 2016. But again after a disappointing season in the 2016 Pro Kabaddi League season (June), they totally revamped their squad. After that, the team has consistently qualified for the playoffs in 2017, 2018 and in 2019 respectively. In 2019, they qualified to the PKL final for the first time in their history by beating U Mumba in The Arena. In the final, against  Dabang Delhi, they were trailing on 3–11 at one stage. However they made a strong comeback and won the final by a 39-34 margin without their captain Maninder Singh who sustained a shoulder injury in the penultimate league stage. Thus they clinched their first ever PKL title.

Current squad

Seasons

Season I

Bengal Warriors finished seventh in the first season.

Season II

Bengal Warriors finished 6th in the second season.

Season III
Bengal Warriors finished 4th in the third season.

Season IV

Season V

Bengal Warriors finished 8th in the Fourth season.

Season VI

Season VII

Bengal Warriors became the Champions.

Season VIII

Season IX

Records

Overall results Pro Kabbaddi season

By opposition
''Note: Table lists in alphabetical order.

Sponsors

References

External links 
 Bengal Warriors Team

Pro Kabaddi League teams
2014 establishments in West Bengal
Kabaddi clubs established in 2014
Future Group